The 2000 Cleveland Indians season was the 100th season for the franchise, within the American Major League Baseball organization. For the season two new players were signed; Chris Coste and Mark Whiten. The results of the season consisted of 90 wins and 72 losses.

Offseason
 November 16, 1999: Chris Coste was signed as a free agent by the Indians.
 February 18, 2000: Mark Whiten was signed as a free agent by the Indians.

Regular season

Season standings

Record vs. opponents

Notable transactions
June 16, 2000: Mike Mohler was signed as a free agent with the Cleveland Indians.
 June 29, 2000: David Justice was traded by the Indians to the New York Yankees for Ricky Ledée, Jake Westbrook, and Zach Day.
 July 28, 2000: Ricky Ledée was traded by the Indians to the Texas Rangers for David Segui.
 July 28, 2000: Richie Sexson, Paul Rigdon, Kane Davis, and a player to be named later were traded by the Indians to the Milwaukee Brewers for Bob Wickman, Jason Bere and Steve Woodard. The Indians completed the deal by sending Marco Scutaro to the Brewers on August 30.

Roster

Game log

|-align="center" bgcolor="#bbffbb"
| 1 || April 3 || @ Orioles || 4 – 1 || Colón (1-0) || Mussina (0-1) || Karsay (1) || 46,902 || 1-0
|-align="center" bgcolor="#ffbbbb"
| 2 || April 5 || @ Orioles || 11 – 7 || Ryan (1-0) || Kamieniecki (0-1) || || 33,833 || 1-1
|-align="center" bgcolor="#ffbbbb"
| 3 || April 6 || @ Orioles || 6 – 2 || Rapp (1-0) || Nagy (0-1) || Groom (1) || 35,181 || 1-2
|-align="center" bgcolor="#bbffbb"
| 4 || April 7 || @ Devil Rays || 14 – 5 || Wright (1-0) || Guzmán (0-1) || || 40,329 || 2-2
|-align="center" bgcolor="#bbffbb"
| 5 || April 8 || @ Devil Rays || 6 – 4 || Burba (1-0) || Trachsel (1-1) || Karsay (2) || 30,177 || 3-2
|-align="center" bgcolor="#bbffbb"
| 6 || April 9 || @ Devil Rays || 17 – 4 || Colón (2-0) || Rupe (0-1) || || 21,357 || 4-2
|-align="center" bgcolor="#bbffbb"
| 7 || April 10 || @ Athletics || 9 – 4 || Kamieniecki (1-1) || Tam (0-1) || || 9,123 || 5-2
|-align="center" bgcolor="#bbffbb"
| 8 || April 11 || @ Athletics || 5 – 1 || Nagy (1-1) || Olivares (1-1) || || 8,638 || 6-2
|-align="center" bgcolor="#bbffbb"
| 9 || April 12 || @ Athletics || 5 – 0 || Wright (2-0) || Heredia (0-1) || || 14,683 || 7-2
|-align="center" bgcolor="#ffbbbb"
| 10 || April 14 || Rangers || 7 – 2 || Helling (2-0) || Burba (1-1) || || 42,727 || 7-3
|-align="center" bgcolor="#ffbbbb"
| 11 || April 15 || Rangers || 6 – 4 || Clark  (2-0) || Colón (2-1) || Wetteland (1) || 40,543 || 7-4
|-align="center" bgcolor="#bbffbb"
| 12 || April 16 || Rangers || 2 – 1 || Finley (1-0) || Wetteland (0-1) || || 40,626 || 8-4
|-align="center" bgcolor="#ffbbbb"
| 13 || April 18 || Athletics || 8 – 5 || Mulder (1-0) || Nagy (1-2) || Isringhausen (3) || 40,551 || 8-5
|-align="center" bgcolor="#ffbbbb"
| 14 || April 19 || Athletics || 10 – 5 || Appier (3-1) || Wright (2-1) || || 40,531 || 8-6
|-align="center" bgcolor="#bbffbb"
| 15 || April 20 || Athletics || 9 – 5 || Burba (2-1) || Hudson (1-2) || || 42,134 || 9-6
|-align="center" bgcolor="#bbffbb"
| 16 || April 24 || @ Mariners || 6 – 0 || Finley (2-0) || Meche (0-2) || || 30,354 || 10-6
|-align="center" bgcolor="#ffbbbb"
| 17 || April 25 || @ Mariners || 8 – 5 || Halama (2-0) || Nagy (1-3) || || 27,579 || 10-7
|-align="center" bgcolor="#bbffbb"
| 18 || April 26 || @ Mariners || 5 – 3 (10) || Shuey (1-0) || Rhodes (1-2) || || 37,086 || 11-7
|-align="center" bgcolor="#bbffbb"
| 19 || April 28 || Red Sox || 4 – 3 || Burba (3-1) || Schourek (1-2) || Karsay (3) || 42,885 || 12-7
|-align="center" bgcolor="#bbffbb"
| 20 || April 29 || Red Sox || 3 – 2 || Finley (3-0) || Martínez (1-2) || Karsay (4) || 42,453 || 13-7
|-align="center" bgcolor="#ffbbbb"
| 21 || April 30 || Red Sox || 2 – 1 || Martínez (5-0) || Nagy (1-4) || Lowe (5) || 42,065 || 13-8
|-

|-align="center" bgcolor="#ffbbbb"
| 22 || May 1 || Yankees || 2 – 1 || Mendoza (3-2) || Wright (2-2) || Rivera (8) || 42,711 || 13-9
|-align="center" bgcolor="#ffbbbb"
| 23 || May 2 || Yankees || 4 – 2 || Pettitte (1-1) || Witt (0-1) || Rivera (9) || 42,801 || 13-10
|-align="center" bgcolor="#ffbbbb"
| 24 || May 3 || Yankees || 6 – 5 || Grimsley (1-0) || Karsay (0-1) || Rivera (10) || 42,837 || 13-11
|-align="center" bgcolor="#ffbbbb"
| 25 || May 4 || @ Blue Jays || 8 – 1 || Wells (5-1) || Finley (3-1) || || 16,637 || 13-12
|-align="center" bgcolor="#ffbbbb"
| 26 || May 5 || @ Blue Jays || 11 – 10 || Koch (2-0) || Shuey (1-1) || || 19,191 || 13-13
|-align="center" bgcolor="#bbffbb"
| 27 || May 6 || @ Blue Jays || 8 – 6 || Rincón (1-0) || Quantrill (0-1) || Karsay (5) || 23,730 || 14-13
|-align="center" bgcolor="#bbffbb"
| 28 || May 7 || @ Blue Jays || 10 – 8 (12) || Shuey (2-1) || Gunderson (0-1) || Karsay (6) || 19,161 || 15-13
|-align="center" bgcolor="#bbffbb"
| 29 || May 8 || @ Twins || 3 – 2 (10) || Rincón (2-0) || Wells (0-3) || Karsay (7) || 7,309 || 16-13
|-align="center" bgcolor="#ffbbbb"
| 30 || May 9 || @ Twins || 6 – 5 || Hawkins (1-1) || Finley (3-2) || Miller (1) || 7,777 || 16-14
|-align="center" bgcolor="#ffbbbb"
| 31 || May 10 || @ Twins || 10 – 9 || Guardado (3-1) || Karsay (0-2) || || 9,505 || 16-15
|-align="center" bgcolor="#bbffbb"
| 32 || May 11 || Royals || 16 – 0 || Wright (3-2) || Durbin (1-2) || || 41,905 || 17-15
|-align="center" bgcolor="#bbffbb"
| 33 || May 12 || Royals || 7 – 3 || Colón (3-1) || Batista (1-1) || || 42,801 || 18-15
|-align="center" bgcolor="#bbffbb"
| 34 || May 13 || Royals || 7 – 6 (12) || Reed (1-0) || Reichert (1-2) || || 40,689 || 19-15
|-align="center" bgcolor="#ffbbbb"
| 35 || May 14 || Royals || 5 – 4 || Suzuki (1-0) || Finley (3-3) || Spradlin (1) || 40,530 || 19-16
|-align="center" bgcolor="#bbffbb"
| 36 || May 16 || Tigers || 11 – 9 || Nagy (2-4) || Nomo (1-3) || Karsay (8) || 40,633 || 20-16
|-align="center" bgcolor="#bbffbb"
| 37 || May 17 || Tigers || 7 – 2 || Colón (4-1) || Nitkowski (2-7) || || 40,652 || 21-16
|-align="center" bgcolor="#ffbbbb"
| 38 || May 19 || Yankees || 11 – 7 || Mendoza (4-2) || Kamieniecki (1-2) || || 42,642 || 21-17
|-align="center" bgcolor="#bbffbb"
| 39 || May 20 || Yankees || 3 – 2 || Shuey (3-1) || Nelson (6-1) || || 42,583 || 22-17
|-align="center" bgcolor="#bbffbb"
| 40 || May 21 || Yankees || 6 – 1 || Rigdon (1-0) || Hernández (4-4) || || 42,587 || 23-17
|-align="center" bgcolor="#ffbbbb"
| 41 || May 23 || @ Tigers || 10 – 4 || Blair (2-0) || Colón (4-2) || || 27,039 || 23-18
|-align="center" bgcolor="#ffbbbb"
| 42 || May 24 || @ Tigers || 10 – 9 || Patterson (2-0) || Watson (0-1) || Jones (13) || 27,274 || 23-19
|-align="center" bgcolor="#bbffbb"
| 43 || May 25 || @ Tigers || 4 – 1 || Burba (4-1) || Moehler (1-3) || Karsay (9) || 30,103 || 24-19
|-align="center" bgcolor="#ffbbbb"
| 44 || May 26 || @ White Sox || 5 – 3 || Eldred (5-2) || Finley (3-4) || Foulke (8) || 18,225 || 24-20
|-align="center" bgcolor="#ffbbbb"
| 45 || May 27 || @ White Sox || 14 – 3 || Parque (4-2) || Wright (3-3) || || 30,250 || 24-21
|-align="center" bgcolor="#bbffbb"
| 46 || May 28 || @ White Sox || 12 – 3 || Colón (5-2) || Wells (3-4) || || 24,192 || 25-21
|-align="center" bgcolor="#ffbbbb"
| 47 || May 29 || Angels || 3 – 2 (10) || Hasegawa (4-0) || Karsay (0-3) || Percival (15) || 42,888 || 25-22
|-align="center" bgcolor="#bbffbb"
| 48 || May 30 || Angels || 6 – 1 || Burba (5-1) || Schoeneweis (5-3) || || 42,910 || 26-22
|-align="center" bgcolor="#bbffbb"
| 49 || May 31 || Angels || 7 – 3 || Finley (4-4) || Etherton (0-1) || Karsay (10) || 41,637 || 27-22
|-

|-align="center" bgcolor="#ffbbbb"
| 50 || June 2 || @ Cardinals || 5 – 1 || Kile (8-3) || Wright (3-4) || || 41,685 || 27-23
|-align="center" bgcolor="#bbffbb"
| 51 || June 3 || @ Cardinals || 4 – 2 || Colón (6-2) || Stephenson (8-1) || Karsay (11) || 48,252 || 28-23
|-align="center" bgcolor="#bbffbb"
| 52 || June 4 || @ Cardinals || 3 – 2 || Martin (1-0) || Morris (0-1) || Karsay (12) || 44,594 || 29-23
|-align="center" bgcolor="#bbffbb"
| 53 || June 5 || @ Brewers || 8 – 4 || Burba (6-1) || D'Amico (2-4) || || 13,749 || 30-23
|-align="center" bgcolor="#bbffbb"
| 54 || June 6 || @ Brewers || 4 – 2 || Finley (5-4) || Snyder (0-2) || || 24,595 || 31-23
|-align="center" bgcolor="#bbffbb"
| 55 || June 7 || @ Brewers || 9 – 5 || Brewington (1-0) || Bere (3-5) || || 15,518 || 32-23
|-align="center" bgcolor="#ffbbbb"
| 56 || June 8 || @ Red Sox || 3 – 0 || Martínez (9-2) || Colón (6-3) || Lowe (13) || 31,438 || 32-24
|-align="center" bgcolor="#bbffbb"
| 57 || June 9 || Reds || 7 – 4 || Brower (1-0) || Neagle (5-1) || Karsay (13) || 43,105 || 33-24
|-align="center" bgcolor="#bbffbb"
| 58 || June 10 || Reds || 6 – 5 || Burba (7-1) || Parris (2-9) || Karsay (14) || 43,084 || 34-24
|-align="center" bgcolor="#ffbbbb"
| 59 || June 11 || Reds || 7 – 5 (13) || Aybar (1-2) || Kamieniecki (1-3) || || 43,036 || 34-25
|-align="center" bgcolor="#ffbbbb"
| 60 || June 12 || White Sox || 8 – 7 || Eldred (7-2) || Rigdon (1-1) || Foulke (15) || 43,229 || 34-26
|-align="center" bgcolor="#ffbbbb"
| 61 || June 13 || White Sox || 4 – 3 (10) || Simas (1-1) || Speier (0-1) || Howry (2) || 43,233 || 34-27
|-align="center" bgcolor="#ffbbbb"
| 62 || June 14 || White Sox || 11 – 4 || Beirne (1-0) || Brower (1-1) || || 43,284 || 34-28
|-align="center" bgcolor="#ffbbbb"
| 63 || June 16 || @ Tigers || 5 – 2 || Moehler (4-3) || Burba (7-2) || Jones (19) || 39,072 || 34-29
|-align="center" bgcolor="#ffbbbb"
| 64 || June 17 || @ Tigers || 8 – 6 || Brocail (3-3) || Karsay (0-4) || || 39,569 || 34-30
|-align="center" bgcolor="#bbffbb"
| 65 || June 18 || @ Tigers || 9 – 4 || Speier (1-1) || Patterson (2-1) || || 39,123 || 35-30
|-align="center" bgcolor="#ffbbbb"
| 66 || June 19 || @ White Sox || 6 – 1 || Wells (4-5) || Colón (6-4) || || 43,062 || 35-31
|-align="center" bgcolor="#bbffbb"
| 67 || June 20 || @ White Sox || 4 – 1 || Brower (2-1) || Sirotka (6-6) || Karsay (15) || 20,005 || 36-31
|-align="center" bgcolor="#bbffbb"
| 68 || June 21 || @ White Sox || 8 – 6 || Burba (8-2) || Baldwin (10-2) || Karsay (16) || 23,516 || 37-31
|-align="center" bgcolor="#ffbbbb"
| 69 || June 22 || @ White Sox || 6 – 0 || Eldred (9-2) || Finley (5-5) || || 23,374 || 37-32
|-align="center" bgcolor="#ffbbbb"
| 70 || June 23 || Tigers || 7 – 6 || Blair (4-1) || Navarro (0-1) || Jones (20) || 43,095 || 37-33
|-align="center" bgcolor="#bbffbb"
| 71 || June 24 || Tigers || 8 – 1 || Colón (7-4) || Sparks (0-1) || || 43,081 || 38-33
|-align="center" bgcolor="#ffbbbb"
| 72 || June 24 || Tigers || 14 – 8 || Nitkowski (4-7) || Mohler (0-1) || || 43,083 || 38-34
|-align="center" bgcolor="#bbffbb"
| 73 || June 25 || Tigers || 2 – 1 || Karsay (1-4) || Anderson (3-1) || || 43,062 || 39-34
|-align="center" bgcolor="#ffbbbb"
| 74 || June 26 || Tigers || 13 – 2 || Moehler (5-4) || Burba (8-3) || || 43,191 || 39-35
|-align="center" bgcolor="#bbffbb"
| 75 || June 27 || @ Royals || 12 – 1 || Finley (6-5) || Suzuki (3-2) || || 16,908 || 40-35
|-align="center" bgcolor="#ffbbbb"
| 76 || June 28 || @ Royals || 8 – 1 || Witasick (2-7) || Davis (0-1) || || 19,522 || 40-36
|-align="center" bgcolor="#ffbbbb"
| 77 || June 29 || @ Royals || 6 – 1 || Durbin (2-3) || Colón (7-5) || || 25,295 || 40-37
|-align="center" bgcolor="#ffbbbb"
| 78 || June 30 || Twins || 7 – 2 || Redman (5-3) || Brower (2-2) || Hawkins (3) || 43,124 || 40-38
|-

|-align="center" bgcolor="#ffbbbb"
| 79 || July 1 || Twins || 4 – 3 (10) || Guardado (4-2) || Karsay (1-5) || Wells (6) || 43,185 || 40-39
|-align="center" bgcolor="#bbffbb"
| 80 || July 2 || Twins || 7 – 1 || Finley (7-5) || Mays (4-10) || || 43,181 || 41-39
|-align="center" bgcolor="#bbffbb"
| 81 || July 4 || Blue Jays || 9 – 4 || Colón (8-5) || Frascatore (1-3) || || 43,222 || 42-39
|-align="center" bgcolor="#bbffbb"
| 82 || July 5 || Blue Jays || 15 – 7 || Brewington (2-0) || Quantrill (0-4) || || 43,141 || 43-39
|-align="center" bgcolor="#ffbbbb"
| 83 || July 6 || Blue Jays || 9 – 6 || Carpenter (7-7) || Burba (8-4) || Koch (19) || 43,237 || 43-40
|-align="center" bgcolor="#ffbbbb"
| 84 || July 7 || @ Reds || 2 – 1 || Neagle (8-2) || Finley (7-6) || Graves (14) || 53,509 || 43-41
|-align="center" bgcolor="#ffbbbb"
| 85 || July 8 || @ Reds || 14 – 5 || Parris (5-11) || Davis (0-2) || || 54,335 || 43-42
|-align="center" bgcolor="#bbffbb"
| 86 || July 9 || @ Reds || 5 – 3 || Colón (9-5) || Williamson (2-6) || Karsay (17) || 51,181 || 44-42
|-align="center" bgcolor="#bbffbb"
| 87 || July 13 || Pirates || 4 – 3 (10) || Karsay (2-5) || Sauerbeck (3-1) || || 43,225 || 45-42
|-align="center" bgcolor="#bbffbb"
| 88 || July 14 || Pirates || 9 – 3 || Finley (8-6) || Benson (8-7) || || 43,046 || 46-42
|-align="center" bgcolor="#bbffbb"
| 89 || July 15 || Pirates || 6 – 4 || Brewington (3-0) || Silva (5-4) || Karsay (18) || 43,049 || 47-42
|-align="center" bgcolor="#ffbbbb"
| 90 || July 16 || Astros || 5 – 1 || Elarton (9-3) || Colón (9-6) || || 43,031 || 47-43
|-align="center" bgcolor="#bbffbb"
| 91 || July 17 || Astros || 8 – 6 || Drew (1-0) || Miller (0-2) || Karsay (19) || 43,081 || 48-43
|-align="center" bgcolor="#bbffbb"
| 92 || July 18 || Astros || 8 – 2 || Burba (9-4) || Reynolds (6-7) || || 43,135 || 49-43
|-align="center" bgcolor="#ffbbbb"
| 93 || July 19 || Royals || 10 – 5 || Suzuki (5-4) || Finley (8-7) || || 43,248 || 49-44
|-align="center" bgcolor="#ffbbbb"
| 94 || July 20 || Royals || 10 – 6 || Suppan (4-6) || Brower (2-3) || || 43,222 || 49-45
|-align="center" bgcolor="#ffbbbb"
| 95 || July 21 || @ Twins || 2 – 1 || Redman (8-4) || Colón (9-7) || Hawkins (7) || 19,231 || 49-46
|-align="center" bgcolor="#ffbbbb"
| 96 || July 22 || @ Twins || 10 – 6 || Santana (2-2) || Davis (0-3) || Wells (7) || 14,108 || 49-47
|-align="center" bgcolor="#bbffbb"
| 97 || July 23 || @ Twins || 8 – 3 || Burba (10-4) || Radke (7-11) || || 13,623 || 50-47
|-align="center" bgcolor="#bbffbb"
| 98 || July 25 || @ Blue Jays || 10 – 3 || Finley (10-7) || Escobar (7-10) || || 28,672 || 51-47
|-align="center" bgcolor="#ffbbbb"
| 99 || July 26 || @ Blue Jays || 8 – 1 || Wells (16-3) || Colón (9-8) || || 31,183 || 51-48
|-align="center" bgcolor="#bbffbb"
| 100 || July 29 || @ Orioles || 14 – 3 || Bere (1-0) || Rapp (6-7) || || 47,715 || 52-48
|-align="center" bgcolor="#ffbbbb"
| 101 || July 29 || @ Orioles || 4 – 0 || Mercedes (6-4) || Woodard (0-1) || || 47,355 || 52-49
|-align="center" bgcolor="#ffbbbb"
| 102 || July 30 || @ Orioles || 10 – 7 || Parrish (1-1) || Finley (9-8) || || 47,065 || 52-50
|-

|-align="center" bgcolor="#ffbbbb"
| 103 || August 1 || @ Devil Rays || 6 – 5 || Creek (1-1) || Wickman (0-1) || || 24,481 || 52-51
|-align="center" bgcolor="#bbffbb"
| 104 || August 2 || @ Devil Rays || 5 – 3 || Karsay (3-5) || Creek (1-2) || Wickman (1) || 16,909 || 53-51
|-align="center" bgcolor="#bbffbb"
| 105 || August 3 || @ Devil Rays || 5 – 1 || Bere (2-0) || Lopez (8-8) || || 21,703 || 54-51
|-align="center" bgcolor="#bbffbb"
| 106 || August 4 || Angels || 11 – 10 || Wickman (1-1) || Percival (4-5) || || 43,182 || 55-51
|-align="center" bgcolor="#bbffbb"
| 107 || August 5 || Angels || 6 – 3 || Speier (2-1) || Schoeneweis (5-6) || || 43,162 || 56-51
|-align="center" bgcolor="#bbffbb"
| 108 || August 6 || Angels || 5 – 2 || Colón (10-8) || Cooper (4-7) || Wickman (2) || 43,133 || 57-51
|-align="center" bgcolor="#bbffbb"
| 109 || August 7 || Rangers || 2 – 0 || Reed (2-0) || Helling (13-8) || Wickman (3) || 43,258 || 58-51
|-align="center" bgcolor="#ffbbbb"
| 110 || August 8 || Rangers || 11 – 2 || Rogers (11-9) || Bere (2-1) || || 43,238 || 58-52
|-align="center" bgcolor="#bbffbb"
| 111 || August 9 || Rangers || 6 – 4 || Speier (3-1) || Perisho (2-4) || Wickman (4) || 43,333 || 59-52
|-align="center" bgcolor="#ffbbbb"
| 112 || August 11 || @ Mariners || 7 – 1 || Abbott (8-4) || Finley (9-9) || Paniagua (3) || 45,335 || 59-53
|-align="center" bgcolor="#bbffbb"
| 113 || August 12 || @ Mariners || 5 – 4 || Colón (11-8) || Halama (10-6) || Wickman (5) || 45,356 || 60-53
|-align="center" bgcolor="#bbffbb"
| 114 || August 13 || @ Mariners || 10 – 4 || Speier (4-1) || García (4-3) || || 45,380 || 61-53
|-align="center" bgcolor="#ffbbbb"
| 115 || August 14 || @ Athletics || 8 – 1 || Appier (11-9) || Bere (2-2) || || 12,799 || 61-54
|-align="center" bgcolor="#ffbbbb"
| 116 || August 15 || @ Athletics || 5 – 3 || Mulder (7-8) || Burba (10-5) || Isringhausen (26) || 18,691 || 61-55
|-align="center" bgcolor="#ffbbbb"
| 117 || August 16 || @ Athletics || 7 – 6 || Jones (3-1) || Wickman (1-2) || || 32,376 || 61-56
|-align="center" bgcolor="#bbffbb"
| 118 || August 18 || Mariners || 9 – 8 || Karsay (4-5) || Rhodes (3-6) || || 43,126 || 62-56
|-align="center" bgcolor="#bbffbb"
| 119 || August 19 || Mariners || 10 – 4 || Bere (3-2) || Moyer (11-7) || || 43,187 || 63-56
|-align="center" bgcolor="#bbffbb"
| 120 || August 20 || Mariners || 12 – 4 || Burba (11-5) || Sele (13-8) || || 43,144 || 64-56
|-align="center" bgcolor="#bbffbb"
| 121 || August 22 || Athletics || 14 – 6 || Finley (10-9) || Heredia (13-9) || || 43,299 || 65-56
|-align="center" bgcolor="#bbffbb"
| 122 || August 23 || Athletics || 7 – 5 || Shuey (4-1) || Hudson (13-6) || Wickman (6) || 43,231 || 66-56
|-align="center" bgcolor="#ffbbbb"
| 123 || August 24 || Athletics || 11 – 7 || Zito (2-2) || Woodard (0-2) || Mecir (2) || 43,276 || 66-57
|-align="center" bgcolor="#ffbbbb"
| 124 || August 25 || @ Angels || 4 – 1 || Wise (3-1) || Burba (11-6) || Hasegawa (7) || 41,452 || 66-58
|-align="center" bgcolor="#bbffbb"
| 125 || August 26 || @ Angels || 9 – 5 || Bere (4-2) || Schoeneweis (6-7) || || 37,697 || 67-58
|-align="center" bgcolor="#ffbbbb"
| 126 || August 27 || @ Angels || 10 – 9 || Levine (3-4) || Finley (10-10) || Hasegawa (8) || 31,504 || 67-59
|-align="center" bgcolor="#bbffbb"
| 127 || August 28 || @ Rangers || 5 – 2 || Colón (12-8) || Rogers (11-12) || Wickman (7) || 22,134 || 68-59
|-align="center" bgcolor="#bbffbb"
| 128 || August 29 || @ Rangers || 12 – 1 || Woodard (1-2) || Glynn (3-3) || || 22,389 || 69-59
|-align="center" bgcolor="#bbffbb"
| 129 || August 30 || @ Rangers || 5 – 3 || Burba (12-6) || Davis (5-5) || Wickman (8) || 24,215 || 70-59
|-align="center" bgcolor="#ffbbbb"
| 130 || August 31 || @ Rangers || 14 – 7 || Venafro (3-1) || Karsay (4-6) || || 27,333 || 70-60
|-

|-align="center" bgcolor="#bbffbb"
| 131 || September 1 || Orioles || 5 – 2 || Finley (11-10) || Ponson (7-10) || Wickman (9) || 42,647 || 71-60
|-align="center" bgcolor="#ffbbbb"
| 132 || September 2 || Orioles || 8 – 6 || Rapp (7-10) || Karsay (4-7) || Kohlmeier (8) || 42,736 || 71-61
|-align="center" bgcolor="#bbffbb"
| 133 || September 3 || Orioles || 12 – 11 (13) || Cairncross (1-0) || Trombley (4-5) || || 42,630 || 72-61
|-align="center" bgcolor="#bbffbb"
| 134 || September 4 || Devil Rays || 5 – 1 || Burba (13-6) || Lopez (11-10) || || 42,628 || 73-61
|-align="center" bgcolor="#bbffbb"
| 135 || September 5 || Devil Rays || 7 – 4 || Bere (5-2) || Fiore (1-1) || Wickman (10) || 42,660 || 74-61
|-align="center" bgcolor="#bbffbb"
| 136 || September 6 || Devil Rays || 6 – 2 || Finley (12-10) || Harper (0-1) || || 42,742 || 75-61
|-align="center" bgcolor="#ffbbbb"
| 137 || September 7 || Devil Rays || 4 – 3 || Rekar (6-9) || Karsay (4-8) || Hernández (29) || 42,709 || 75-62
|-align="center" bgcolor="#ffbbbb"
| 138 || September 8 || White Sox || 5 – 4 || Buehrle (4-1) || Woodard (1-3) || Foulke (29) || 42,526 || 75-63
|-align="center" bgcolor="#bbffbb"
| 139 || September 9 || White Sox || 9 – 3 || Burba (14-6) || Garland (3-6) || || 42,561 || 76-63
|-align="center" bgcolor="#ffbbbb"
| 140 || September 12 || Red Sox || 8 – 6 || Martinez (10-6) || Finley (12-11) || Lowe (33) || 42,714 || 76-64
|-align="center" bgcolor="#bbffbb"
| 141 || September 13 || Red Sox || 10 – 3 || Colón (13-8) || Ohka (3-5) || || 42,667 || 77-64
|-align="center" bgcolor="#ffbbbb"
| 142 || September 14 || Red Sox || 7 – 4 || Martínez (17-5) || Nagy (2-5) || Lowe (34) || 42,709 || 77-65
|-align="center" bgcolor="#bbffbb"
| 143 || September 15 || @ Yankees || 11 – 1 || Burba (15-6) || Cone (4-12) || || 48,443 || 78-65
|-align="center" bgcolor="#ffbbbb"
| 144 || September 16 || @ Yankees || 6 – 3 || Hernández (12-11) || Bere (5-3) || || 55,097 || 78-66
|-align="center" bgcolor="#bbffbb"
| 145 || September 17 || @ Yankees || 15 – 4 || Finley (13-11) || Neagle (7-5) || || 50,174 || 79-66
|-align="center" bgcolor="#bbffbb"
| 146 || September 18 || @ Yankees || 2 – 0 || Colón (14-8) || Clemens (13-7) || || 31,317 || 80-66
|-align="center" bgcolor="#ffbbbb"
| 147 || September 19 || @ Red Sox || 7 – 4 || Beck (2-0) || Nagy (2-6) || Lowe (37) || 32,512 || 80-67
|-align="center" bgcolor="#bbffbb"
| 148 || September 20 || @ Red Sox || 2 – 1 || Woodard (2-3) || Martínez (17-6) || Wickman (11) || 33,002 || 81-67
|-align="center" bgcolor="#bbffbb"
| 149 || September 20 || @ Red Sox || 5 – 4 || Karsay (5-8) || Cormier (2-3) || Wickman (12) || 32,751 || 82-67
|-align="center" bgcolor="#ffbbbb"
| 150 || September 21 || @ Red Sox || 9 – 8 || Ontiveros (1-1) || Speier (4-2) || Lowe (38) || 31,404 || 82-68
|-align="center" bgcolor="#bbffbb"
| 151 || September 21 || @ Red Sox || 8 – 5 || Finley (14-11) || Wakefield (6-10) || || 32,743 || 83-68
|-align="center" bgcolor="#ffbbbb"
| 152 || September 22 || @ Royals || 3 – 2 || Bottalico (8-6) || Karsay (5-9) || || 15,036 || 83-69
|-align="center" bgcolor="#bbffbb"
| 153 || September 23 || @ Royals || 11 – 1 || Colón (15-8) || Reichert (8-9) || || 20,253 || 84-69
|-align="center" bgcolor="#ffbbbb"
| 154 || September 24 || @ Royals || 9 – 0 || Stein (8-4) || Nagy (2-7) || || 12,606 || 84-70
|-align="center" bgcolor="#bbffbb"
| 155 || September 25 || White Sox || 9 – 2 || Burba (16-6) || Garland (4-8) || || 42,500 || 85-70
|-align="center" bgcolor="#ffbbbb"
| 156 || September 25 || Twins || 4 – 3 || Miller (2-3) || Shuey (4-2) || Hawkins (13) || 42,853 || 85-71
|-align="center" bgcolor="#bbffbb"
| 157 || September 26 || Twins || 4 – 2 || Finley (15-11) || Romero (2-7) || Wickman (13) || 42,773 || 86-71
|-align="center" bgcolor="#bbffbb"
| 158 || September 27 || Twins || 8 – 2 || Bere (6-3) || Radke (12-16) || || 42,864 || 87-71
|-align="center" bgcolor="#ffbbbb"
| 159 || September 28 || Twins || 4 – 3 (10) || Guardado (7-3) || Wickman (1-3) || Hawkins (14) || 42,821 || 87-72
|-align="center" bgcolor="#bbffbb"
| 160 || September 29 || Blue Jays || 8 – 4 || Speier (5-2) || Trachsel (8-15) || Karsay (20) || 42,768 || 88-72
|-align="center" bgcolor="#bbffbb"
| 161 || September 30 || Blue Jays || 6 – 5 || Finley (16-11) || Loaiza (10-13) || Wickman (14) || 42,676 || 89-72
|-

|-align="center" bgcolor="#bbffbb"
| 162 || October 1 || Blue Jays || 11 – 4 || Woodard (3-3) || Wells (20-8) || || 42,594 || 90-72
|-

Player stats

Batting

Starters by position
Note: Pos = Position; G = Games played; AB = At bats; R = Runs scored; H = Hits; 2B = Doubles; 3B = Triples; HR = Home runs; RBI = Runs batted in; AVG = Batting average; SB = Stolen bases

Other batters
Note: G = Games played; AB = At bats; R = Runs scored; H = Hits; 2B = Doubles; 3B = Triples; HR = Home runs; RBI = Runs batted in; AVG = Batting average; SB = Stolen bases

Note: Pitchers' batting statistics are not included above.

Pitching

Starting pitchers
Note: W = Wins; L = Losses; ERA = Earned run average; G = Games pitched; GS = Games started; IP = Innings pitched; H = Hits allowed; BB = Walks allowed; K = Strikeouts

Other pitchers
Note: W = Wins; L = Losses; ERA = Earned run average; G = Games pitched; GS = Games started; SV = Saves; IP = Innings pitched; H = Hits allowed; BB = Walks allowed; K = Strikeouts

Relief pitchers
Note: W = Wins; L = Losses; ERA = Earned run average; G = Games pitched; SV = Saves; IP = Innings pitched; H = Hits allowed; BB = Walks allowed; K = Strikeouts

Award winners

All-Star Game

Minor league affiliates

Notes

References
2000 Cleveland Indians at Baseball Reference
2000 Cleveland Indians at Baseball Almanac

Cleveland Guardians seasons
Cleveland Indians season
Cleve